Staub is a premium French enameled cast iron cookware and bakeware manufacturer that was originally headquartered in Turckheim, Alsace, France. The first piece, a cocotte or coquelle (Dutch oven), was designed by Francis Staub in 1974 in a dormant artillery factory. Pieces are manufactured with cast iron covered with double-glazed enamel. The enamel coating makes the cookware rustproof, and easy to clean. Staub's cocottes have nubs on the interior of the lids, which enables condensation to collect and drip down to baste foods uniformly as they are cooking.

Company overview
In 2007, approximately 50% of the company's sales revenue was from abroad, and the company realized €44 million in total sales. In April 2008, the company had 430 employees, and at this time Francis Staub was president of the company.

Production
In 2008, Staub operated three production facilities in France, a joint venture in Japan and a marketing branch in the United States.

Acquisition
In June 2008, Staub was acquired by Zwilling J. A. Henckels, but it remains and has continued to operate as an independent brand.

Professional use
The cookware's aesthetic complements the decor of a number of restaurants, and some restaurants cook and serve dishes directly to customers at their tables in Staub cookware.

References

Further reading
  Les vins d'Alsace – Jacques-Louis Delpal. pp. 98–99.

External links
 
 

1974 establishments in France
Kitchenware brands
Manufacturing companies established in 1974
Manufacturing companies of France
French brands
Vitreous enamel